Ilona Tőzsér is a Hungarian sprint canoer who competed in the mid-1970s. She won four medals at the ICF Canoe Sprint World Championships with a silver (K-2 500 m: 1973) and three bronzes (K-2 500 m: 1973, 1974; K-4 500 m: 1975).

References

Hungarian female canoeists
Living people
Year of birth missing (living people)
ICF Canoe Sprint World Championships medalists in kayak
20th-century Hungarian women